The 1949 Swedish speedway season was the 1949 season of motorcycle speedway in Sweden.

Individual

Individual Championship
The 1949 Swedish Individual Speedway Championship final was held on 21 October in Stockholm. Olle Nygren won the inaugural Swedish Championship.

Team

Team Championship
Vargarna won the league and were declared the winners of the Swedish Speedway Team Championship.

The league was increased from seven teams to ten teams with the additions of Smålänningarnaa, Piraterna and GEMA Goteborg.

There were also three name changes; Motorsällskapet Stockholm became Getingarna (the Wasps), Nyköping became Griparna (the Grippers) and Vendelsö became Tigrarna.

See also 
 Speedway in Sweden

References

Speedway leagues
Professional sports leagues in Sweden
Swedish
Seasons in Swedish speedway